Stephen Coonts (born July 19, 1946) is an American spy thriller and suspense novelist.

Early life, education, and military career
Stephen Coonts grew up in Buckhannon, West Virginia, a small coal mining town.  Following high school graduation, he earned a B.A. degree in political science at West Virginia University in 1968. After joining the Navy upon graduation and then going to Officer Candidate School, Coonts went to flight school at Naval Air Station Pensacola and earned his wings as a Naval Aviator in 1969.

Coonts was later assigned to Naval Air Station Whidbey Island and VA-128 to train in the A-6 Intruder, a medium attack, all-weather, carrier-based jet.  After training, Coonts was attached to and deployed with VA-196 to Vietnam. With 196, he served aboard the USS Enterprise (CVN-65) on two cruises and accumulated 1600 flying hours in the A-6. Coonts was awarded several commendations, including the Distinguished Flying Cross.

After Vietnam, Coonts served as an A-6 flight instructor for two years, then was assigned as an assistant catapult and arresting gear officer aboard USS Nimitz (CVN-68). Coonts separated from the active duty Navy as a lieutenant in 1977 but remained as reserve officer, retiring as a commander with a total of 21 years of service.

Post military career

Lawyer
After leaving active duty, Coonts pursued a Juris Doctor (J.D.) degree at the University of Colorado, graduating in 1979. He then worked as a lawyer for several oil and gas companies, pursuing his writing interests in his free time.

Writer
Coonts began writing Flight of the Intruder in 1984, with the book being published by the US Naval Institute Press in 1986. The novel, based in part on his experiences as an A-6 pilot during the Vietnam War, remained for 28 weeks on the New York Times bestseller list, and later (1991) was made into a movie. This launched his career as a novelist, and he continued writing adventure-thrillers, most of them based on the main character from his first book, Jake Grafton. Coonts has also written several other series and stand-alone novels, but is best known for the Grafton books. In 1992, he was inducted into the Academy of Distinguished Alumni at his alma mater, West Virginia University.  In 2014 West Virginia University awarded him an honorary Doctor of Letters degree.

Today, Coonts continues to write, having had sixteen New York Times bestsellers (out of 36 books).  He lives in Colorado with his third wife, Deborah Jean. He is divorced from romantic mystery novelist Deborah Coonts.

Bibliography

Jake Grafton series
Note: The list below represents Stephen Coonts' suggested reading order.

Jake Grafton and Tommy Carmellini series

Note: The list below represents Stephen Coonts' suggested reading order.

Saucer series

Anthologies

Deep Black series

Others
Fortunes of War (1998),  
The Garden of Eden (2006) (writing as Eve Adams)
The Sea Witch (May 2012),

As editor
The 17th Day (1999) 
Combat (2001) 
Victory (2003)

Non-fiction
The Cannibal Queen: A Flight into the Heart of America (1992), 
War In The Air: True Accounts (1996), 
On Glorious Wings: The Best Flying Stories (2003), 
Victory (2003),

References

External links
Official site
Coonts' Journal
West Virginia & Regional History Center at West Virginia University, Stephen Coonts, Author, Papers
Stephen Coonts audio interview with National Review Online

 Author Interview at the Pritzker Military Museum & Library on February 13, 2008
Modern Signed Books BlogTalkRadio Interview with Rodger Nichols about The Art of War March 2016

1946 births
Living people
20th-century American novelists
21st-century American novelists
American male novelists
American military writers
Military personnel from West Virginia
United States Navy personnel of the Vietnam War
American thriller writers
Aviators from West Virginia
Nevada lawyers
Nevada Republicans
People from Buckhannon, West Virginia
Recipients of the Distinguished Flying Cross (United States)
West Virginia University alumni
Novelists from West Virginia
United States Navy officers
United States Naval Aviators
20th-century American non-fiction writers
21st-century American non-fiction writers
American male non-fiction writers
20th-century American male writers
21st-century American male writers